The Sacred Squadron was an ad hoc cavalry unit which served briefly in the French Grande Armée during the final stage of the Emperor Napoleon's retreat from Moscow in 1812. It was remarkable in that it consisted - out of military necessity - entirely of officers, with those below the rank of colonel serving as troopers.

The Sacred Squadron was formed on 23 November 1812, by the Bobr River (perhaps at Borisoff, in modern Belarus) to serve as Napoleon's bodyguard. It was disbanded on 10 December 1812, in Kowno (modern Kaunas, Lithuania). It therefore served during the crossing of the Berezina (26-29 November), and continued to exist for a few days after Napoleon's departure for Paris on 5 December. 

French soldiers had earlier coined the phrase "mentir comme un Bulletin" ("to lie like a Bulletin"). The French populace - and government officials - may have been able to read between the lines for the implications of, if not fully to comprehend, what had happened. The Grande Armée had invaded Russia with 80,000 cavalry.

No written order establishing the unit has been found; it is possible that it was set up orally. No official record of those who served in it has survived; considering the circumstances, it is possible that none was ever made, or that the records of Marshal Berthier (Napoleon's Chief of Staff) were lost during the retreat. Other sources give lower numbers than Napoleon's 600: Chandler says 500.

In addition to its commander Général de division Grouchy, the following are said to have served with the Sacred Squadron:
 Général de division de La Tour-Maubourg
 Général de brigade 
 Colonel 
 Colonel 
 Lieutenant-colonel de Castellane
 Lieutenant-colonel (?) 
 Chef d'escadron (?) 
 Chef d'escadron (?) 
 Capitaine Aimé Benoît Delamalle
 Lieutenant (?) 
 Lieutenant Claude-Xavier-Louis-François Martin
 Lieutenant (?) 
 Sous-lieutenant

Notes

References

French military units and formations of the Napoleonic Wars
French invasion of Russia
Military units and formations established in 1812
Military units and formations disestablished in 1812